Sri Venkateswara College of Law is a private law school situated at Tirupati in the Indian state of Andhra Pradesh. The college offers 3 years LL.B. and five-years integrated LL.B. courses approved by the Bar Council of India (BCI), New Delhi and affiliated to Sri Venkateswara University.

History 
This college got permission from the Government of Andhra Pradesh and was established in 1991. It was affiliated to Sri Venkateswara University on 1 June 1992.

References

Law schools in Andhra Pradesh
Universities and colleges in Andhra Pradesh
Educational institutions established in 1991
1991 establishments in Andhra Pradesh